Will Hoge is an American country music artist. His discography comprises ten studio albums, three extended plays, five live albums and six singles.

Studio albums

Extended plays

Live albums

Singles

Guest singles

Music videos

Album appearances

Songs written by

References 

Discographies of American artists
Country music discographies